Mohammad Deris (born Feb 01, 2003) is an Iranian footballer who plays as a goalkeeper for Iranian club Paykan in the Persian Gulf Pro League.

Club career

Sanat Naft
He made his debut for Sanat Naft in last fixtures of 2017–18 Iran Pro League against Esteghlal Khuzestan.

References

Living people
1995 births
People from Abadan, Iran
Association football goalkeepers
Iranian footballers
Sanat Naft Abadan F.C. players
Sportspeople from Khuzestan province